Live at Woburn is a posthumous live album by the Jimi Hendrix Experience, released on July 28, 2009, by Dagger Records. The concert was captured from a recording made from the stage soundboard on July 6, 1968, at the Woburn Music Festival in Woburn, Bedfordshire, England.

Track listing
All songs were written by Jimi Hendrix, except where noted.

"Introduction" – 1:07
"Sgt. Pepper's Lonely Hearts Club Band" (John Lennon, Paul McCartney) – 1:11
"Fire" – 4:19
"Tax Free" (Bo Hansson, Jan Carlsson) – 10:11
"Red House" – 11:30
"Foxy Lady" – 4:55
"Voodoo Child (Slight Return)" – 6:38
"Purple Haze" – 8:10

Personnel
Jimi Hendrixguitar, vocals
Mitch Mitchelldrums
Noel Reddingbass guitar

Live albums published posthumously
Jimi Hendrix live albums
2009 live albums
Dagger Records live albums